Zdobnice is a river in Rychnov nad Kněžnou District in the Czech Republic. It is 34.2 km in length and 124.8 km² in river basin area.

River
The river flows through Zdobnice and below Velká Deštná. The river is located near road II / 310 and continues southwest toward the Divoká Orlice, which it enters near Doudleby nad Orlicí. The average flow rate is 1.95  m³/s. The water can reach 122.0 m³/s.

Canoeing is available, however the river is only passable after heavy rains or melting ice. There is a protected area for the accumulation of surface water which is used to avoid the construction of the Pěčín water reservoir.

References

Further reading

External links
 Slatina nad Zdobnicí – aktuální vodní stav na stránkách ČHMÚ
 Informace pro vodáky

Rivers of the Hradec Králové Region